The Dille–Koppanyi reagent is used as a simple spot-test to presumptively identify barbiturates. It is composed of a mixture of two solutions. Part A is 0.1 g of cobalt(II) acetate dihydrate dissolved in 100 ml of methanol mixed with 0.2 ml of glacial acetic acid. Part B made up of is 5% isopropylamine (v/v) in methanol. Two drops of A are dropped onto the substance followed by one drop of B and any change in colour is observed.

The test turns phenobarbital, pentobarbital, amobarbital and secobarbital light purple by complexation of cobalt with the barbiturate nitrogens. The test, in a slightly different formulation, was developed in the 1930s by the Hungarian-American pharmacologist Theodore Koppanyi (1901–1985) and the American Biochemist, James Madison Dille (1928–1986).

See also
 Drug checking
 Marquis reagent
 Froehde's reagent
 Zwikker reagent

References

Chemical tests
Analytical reagents
Drug testing reagents